is a 2006 Japanese drama film directed by Nobuhiro Yamashita, starring Hirofumi Arai.

Plot
The lives of twin brothers Kotaro and Hikaru change when a woman's body is found on the outskirts of Matsugane after being hit by a car. Kotaro, a police officer, discovers that the woman is still alive and later finds out that it was his brother who had almost killed her.

Cast
Hirofumi Arai as Kotaro Suzuki
Takashi Yamanaka as Hikaru Suzuki
Tomokazu Miura as Toyomichi Suzuki
Midoriko Kimura as Misako Suzuki
Tamae Ando as Haruko Kuniyoshi
Setsuko Karasuma as Izumi Kuniyoshi
Miwa Kawagoe as Miyuki Ikeuchi
Yūichi Kimura as Yuji Nishioka
Mari Nishio as Yoko Togashi
Ken Mitsuishi as Detective

References

External links

 
 

2006 comedy-drama films
2006 films
Japanese comedy-drama films
Films directed by Nobuhiro Yamashita
2000s Japanese-language films
2000s Japanese films